Depressaria varzobella is a moth in the family Depressariidae. It was described by Alexandr L. Lvovsky in 1982. It is found in Tadzhikistan.

References

Moths described in 1982
Depressaria
Moths of Asia